Patissa xanthoperas is a moth in the family Crambidae. It was described by George Hampson in 1896. It is found on Sumatra.

The wingspan is about 30 mm. The forewings are pure white with a black spot at the upper angle of the cell, as well as an orange-yellow apex.

References

Moths described in 1896
Schoenobiinae